Villiers-lès-Aprey (literally Villiers near Aprey) is a commune in the Haute-Marne department in north-eastern France.

See also
Communes of the Haute-Marne department

References

Villierslesaprey